Zvezda is a Russian state-owned nationwide TV network run by the Russian Ministry of Defence. It has communist leanings. As of January 2008, Zvezda's CEO was Grigory Krichevsky, previously known for his work on Vladimir Gusinsky's NTV channel in the late 1990s.

History
In 1998 Central Television and Radio Studio of the Russian Ministry of Defense won the tender to broadcast the channel in the competition. On July 17, 2000, Zvezda channel was licensed for broadcasting. On February 20, 2005, Zvezda channel first began broadcasting on 57th UHF channel in Moscow. On May 16, 2005, the channel began to broadcast around the clock. In 2006 Zvezda was for the first time broadcast in all of Russia. In 2007 the audience of the channel grew further, as it was included in the package of NTV+. Since 2009 Zvezda is a federal status channel.

In March 2015, Zvezda offered a presenting job to Jeremy Clarkson less than 24 hours after he was dismissed by the BBC from motoring programme Top Gear.

In October 2022, the Canadian government sanctioned Zvezda.

Controversies 
Zvezda describes itself as "patriotic" and is considered one of the most sensational and anti-Western news channels in Russia. It has a reputation for publishing biased news stories which favor the Russian government and whitewash Soviet crimes of the past. It has published several controversial news articles, for example:

 Finnish military provocations started the Winter War against the Soviet Union
 Czechoslovakia should be grateful for the Soviet invasion of 1968. After this publication caused significant controversy in Czech Republic, Dmitry Medvedev disavowed himself from the article, saying it does not reflect the official Russian statement expressed in 1993 or 2006.

In 2014–15, Zvezda employed Graham Phillips, a British journalist accused of promoting the Russian narrative in the war in Donbas and who was banned from Ukraine for his 
work. StopFake reported that Phillips was awarded a medal by Russia's Border Guard, a branch of the FSB, a Russian intelligence agency. They reported that Zvezda published an article in July 2015 on the MH17 airplane shot down above Ukraine in 2014 by pro-Russian fighters, which used Phillips' video and witness testimony to assert that the plane was in fact shot down by Ukrainian jets.

References

External links

Russian-language television stations in Russia
Television channels and stations established in 2005
2005 establishments in Russia
Ministry of Defence (Russia)
Military broadcasting
Communist propaganda